David Arnot may refer to:
David Arnot (bishop), 16th century Scottish bishop
David Arnot (Canadian politician), Canadian senator
David Arnot (minister), 19th century Scottish minister
Sir David Arnot, 2nd Baronet of the Arnot baronets, represented Parliament of Scotland constituency Kinross-shire
David Arnot, see Nooitgedacht Glacial Pavements

See also
David Arnott (disambiguation)